Lost Trail Pass is a mountain pass in the Rocky Mountains of the northwestern United States, on the border of Idaho and Montana in the Bitterroot Mountains.

The pass is about a half mile (1 km) west of the Continental Divide, which retreats eastward at this point, inside Montana along the Ravalli–Beaverhead County border, toward Butte. Southeast of Lost Trail Pass, the divide straddles the state line into Yellowstone National Park and continues in Wyoming.

South of the pass in Idaho is the north fork of the Salmon River, which descends with US 93 to North Fork to join the main Salmon River. In Montana, US 93 drops northward into the Bitterroot River Valley and gradually descends toward Hamilton, Lolo, and Missoula.

They later rested for a few days at Travelers' Rest, near present-day Lolo, in preparation for their crossing over the snowy Bitterroots at Lolo Pass back into present-day Idaho, following the Lolo Trail, north of US 12.

The Lost Trail Powder Mountain ski area is at the pass, immediately west of US 93, with lifts and runs in both states.

References

External links
 Idaho Transportation Dept. - webcam - Lost Trail Pass
 Lost Trail.com - Lost Trail Powder Mountain ski area - official site

 David Rumsey Map Collection – Historic road map (1937) – Idaho, Montana, Wyoming – Texaco (Rand McNally)
Idaho highway map (1956) – Shell (H.M. Gousha)

Mountain passes of Idaho
Mountain passes of Montana
Landforms of Lemhi County, Idaho
Landforms of Ravalli County, Montana
Borders of Idaho
Borders of Montana
Transportation in Lemhi County, Idaho
Transportation in Ravalli County, Montana
U.S. Route 93